Daniel Boyd may refer to:

 Daniel Montgomery Boyd (1826–1899), Pennsylvanian industrialist
 Daniel Patrick Boyd (born 1970), American accused of leading a jihadist terrorist cell
 Daniel Boyd (artist), Australian artist
 Daniel Boyd (filmmaker) (born 1956), American filmmaker, author, and communications professor
 Danny Boyd (born 1978), former professional football placekicker and current school music instructor

See also
 Danny Bhoy (born 1975) Scottish comedian
 Danny Boy (disambiguation)